Erich Berneker (3 February 1874 – 15 March 1937) was a German linguist, Slavicist and Balticist, follower of the Neogrammarian school.

He was born in Königsberg. He studied in Leipzig under August Leskien, receiving a doctorate in 1895 with a thesis on Old Prussian language, covering its texts, grammar and an etymological dictionary. Afterwards he went to Russia for a one-year study period. He habilitated in 1899 with a paper on word order in Slavic languages (Berlin, 1900). He worked as a private assistant professor in Berlin from 1902, as an associate professor in Prague, as a full professor since 1908 in Wrocław (German Breslau), and since 1911 in Munich.

He is best known as the author of a Slavic etymological dictionary (letters A-Mor, 1908-1913). In it he collected the inherited Slavic vocabulary, put it into the context of the Indo-European language family, and discussed the most important loanwords in Slavic languages. Although incomplete, this dictionary was of essential influence on the future work in the Slavic etymological studies.

He died in Munich.

References

Balticists
Linguists from Germany
1874 births
1937 deaths
Writers from Königsberg
Members of the Göttingen Academy of Sciences and Humanities